The 2020–21 Oregon State Beavers women's basketball team represented Oregon State University during the 2020–21 NCAA Division I women's basketball season. The Beavers, led by eleventh year head coach Scott Rueck, played their games at the Gill Coliseum as members of the Pac-12 Conference.

Roster

Schedule

|-
!colspan=9 style=| Non-conference regular season

|-
!colspan=9 style=| Pac-12 regular season

|-
!colspan=9 style=|Pac-12 Women's Tournament

|-
!colspan=9 style=|NCAA Women's Tournament

Rankings
2020–21 NCAA Division I women's basketball rankings

^Coaches did not release a Week 2 poll

See also
2020–21 Oregon State Beavers men's basketball team

References

Oregon State Beavers women's basketball seasons
Oregon State
Oregon State Beavers women's basketball
Oregon State Beavers women's basketball
Oregon State